The 1999 Anzac test was a rugby league test match played between Australia and New Zealand at the Sydney Olympic Stadium 23 April 1999. It was the 3rd Anzac test played between the two nations since the first was played under the Super League banner in 1997 and the second to be played in Sydney.

Teams

Match summary

References

1999 in Australian rugby league
1999 in New Zealand rugby league
Anzac Test
International rugby league competitions hosted by Australia
Rugby league in Sydney